The Rosebush House in Millwood, Washington was designed by architect Harold C. Whitehouse and was built in 1923.  It was listed on the U.S. National Register of Historic Places in 2000.  According to its NRHP nomination, "is a landmark example of the French Eclectic architectural style and is one of the most unique properties in the Spokane area."

References

National Register of Historic Places in Spokane, Washington
Houses completed in 1923
Houses on the National Register of Historic Places in Washington (state)
Houses in Spokane County, Washington